Two ships of the Royal Navy have been named HMS Magnanime:

  was a 74-gun third rate captured from the French in 1748 and broken up in 1775.
  was a 64-gun third rate launched in 1780. She was razeed in 1794 to a 44-gun fifth rate frigate and was broken up in 1813.

References
 

Royal Navy ship names